Seacht (Irish for "seven") is a college drama series following the lives of seven college students (Brian, Caroline, Pete, Joanne, Eithne, Linda, Decko, Paddy, and Marcas) at the Arts Department of Queen's University in Belfast.

The drama was broadcast on Irish language broadcaster TG4 and on BBC Two Northern Ireland. 
The show attracted an audience of around 40,000. It aired on 
Mondays 22:55 on TG4, repeated Saturdays at 22:05, and on BBC Two NI on Tuesdays at 22:00.

Awards and critical acclaim
The first series of Seacht was nominated for IFTA and won the Young People category at the 2009 Celtic Media Festival Awards.

Production
Seacht was a creation of Orla King and writer Anne Learmont.

The series was produced by Stirling Film & Television Productions Ltd., Tyrone Productions, and Eo Fis Teoranta and financed by IFB, Northern Ireland Screen, BCI and TG4.

The first series was shot on location in Queen's University, Belfast, in July and August 2007, the second series during the Summer of 2009.

 Writers: Anne Learmont, Louise Ní Fhiannachta, Gemma Breathnach, Colleen Ní Bhraonáin, Ailbhe Nic Giolla Bhrighde, Sean de Gallaí and Edel Ní Dhrisceoil
 Script development executive: Dearbhla Regan
 Storylines: Anne and Ailbhe Nic Giolla Bhrighde
 Director (1st series): Robert Quinn
 Producer: Ferdia MacAnna
 Photography: Tim Fleming
 Music: Ian Smyth

Cast and characters
 Linda Bhreathnach (Eithne)
 Eoghan McDermott (DJ Pete)
 Neasa Ní Chuanaigh (Joanne)
 Aoife Nic Ardghail (Linda)
 Andrew Kavanagh (Decko)
 Alana Henderson (musician) (Caroline)
 Diarmaid Murtagh (Brian) (series 1)
 Cillian O' Donnachadha (Brian) (series 2–4)

Each of the seven lead roles were played by young actors who were selected following extensive nationwide auditions. For the second series three roles had to be cast (replacement for Diarmuid Murtagh as Brian, Paddy and Marcus).

Further cast: 
 Charlotte Bradley
 Tom Ó Súilleabháin
 Bríd Ní Neachtain
 Brendan Murray
 Dairíne Ní Dhonnchú

See also
List of programmes broadcast by TG4

References

External links
 Seacht – official BBC website
 Seacht production details on IFB
 Seacht at the IMDb 
 Seacht on TV.com
 Seacht on Screenrush

British drama television series
2008 British television series debuts
2011 British television series endings
Irish drama television series
2008 Irish television series debuts
2011 Irish television series endings
TG4 original programming